Saint Peter's Cemetery is located just south of Tonnelle Circle near Croxton Yard in Jersey City, New Jersey and is administered by Holy Name Cemetery.

See also

 Hudson County Cemeteries

References

Cemeteries in Hudson County, New Jersey
Roman Catholic cemeteries in New Jersey
Geography of Jersey City, New Jersey